Dallinghoo is a village about  north of Woodbridge, Suffolk, England.

Location 
Dallinghoo is formed from Church Road to the west, Pound Hill to the south and branches northeast after the centre of the village.

Buildings
Dallinghoo's church was originally a large building with a central tower but the chancel has since been destroyed. The Church also had connections with nearby Letheringham Abbey.

People
Dallinghoo is the birthplace of Francis Light, founder of Penang in Malaysia and father of William Light, the founder of Adelaide in Australia.

Press 
Dallinghoo was featured in the press in 2009 after £500,000 worth of Iceni gold coins were found in a field.

References

External links 

 Photos of Dallinghoo
 St. Mary Church, of Dallinghoo

Villages in Suffolk
Civil parishes in Suffolk